Route 309 is a provincial highway located in the Outaouais region in western Quebec. It starts at the junction of Autoroute 50 in the Buckingham sector, in the city of Gatineau's east end. It runs mostly parallel to the Du Lièvre River and ends north of Mont-Laurier in the town of Sainte-Anne-du-Lac in the Upper Laurentians.

Initially, the highway started at the junction of Route 148 in the Masson-Angers sector about 3 kilometers south of Buckingham and about 10 kilometers of its current southern terminus. An eastern extension of A-50, as part of the 3-phase project that would connect both segments of the highway between Buckingham and Brownsburg-Chatham (near Lachute) by 2010, was completed in 2005 and Transports Quebec relocated the route's southern to the current western segment terminus at Dougherty Road to act as a by-pass of Buckingham.

Route 315 replaced the portion of Route 309 from Route 148 to the current routing of Route 315. Portions north of the current Route 315 are no longer marked as a provincial road and are under jurisdiction of the city of Gatineau for the Avenue de Buckingham portion while the municipality of L'Ange-Gardien has the jurisdiction of the segment from the city of Gatineau boundaries to the junction of the new and realigned Route 309.

Municipalities along Route 309
 Gatineau - (Buckingham)
 L'Ange-Gardien
 Notre-Dame-de-la-Salette
 Val-des-Bois
 Notre-Dame-du-Laus
 Notre-Dame-de-Pontmain
 Saint-Aimé-du-Lac-des-Îles
 Kiamika
 Mont-Laurier
 Ferme-Neuve
 Mont-Saint-Michel
 Sainte-Anne-du-Lac

Major intersections

See also
List of Quebec provincial highways
List of Gatineau roads

References

External links 
 Official Transports Quebec Map 
 Route 309 on Google Maps

309
Streets in Gatineau